A Chinatown is an ethnic enclave of Chinese people located outside Greater China, most often in an urban setting. Areas known as "Chinatown" exist throughout the world, including Europe, Asia, Africa, Oceania, and the Americas.

The development of most Chinatowns typically resulted from mass migration to an area without any or with very few Chinese residents. Binondo in Manila, established in 1594, is recognized as the world's oldest Chinatown. Notable early examples outside Asia include San Francisco's Chinatown in the United States and Melbourne's Chinatown in Australia, which were founded in the mid-19th century during the California and Victoria gold rushes, respectively. A more modern example, in Montville, Connecticut, was caused by the displacement of Chinese workers in the Manhattan Chinatown following the September 11th attacks in 2001.

Definition
Oxford Dictionaries defines "Chinatown" as "...a district of any non-Asian town, especially a city or seaport, in which the population is predominantly of Chinese origin".  However, some Chinatowns may have little to do with China. Some "Vietnamese" enclaves are in fact a city's "second Chinatown", and some Chinatowns are in fact pan-Asian, meaning they could also be counted as a Koreatown or Little India. One example includes Asiatown in Cleveland, Ohio. It was initially referred to as a Chinatown but was subsequently renamed due to the influx of non-Chinese Asian Americans who opened businesses there. Today the district acts as a unifying factor for the Chinese, Taiwanese, Korean, Japanese, Filipino, Indian, Vietnamese, Cambodian, Laotian, Nepalese and Thai communities of Cleveland.

Further ambiguities with the term can include Chinese ethnoburbs which by definition are "...suburban ethnic clusters of residential areas and business districts in large metropolitan areas where the intended purpose is to be "...as isolated from the white population as Hispanics".  An article in The New York Times blurs the line further by categorizing very different Chinatowns such as Chinatown, Manhattan, which exists in an urban setting as "traditional"; Monterey Park's Chinatown, which exists in a "suburban" setting (and labeled as such); and Austin, Texas's Chinatown, which is in essence a "fabricated" Chinese-themed mall. This contrasts with narrower definitions, where the term only described Chinatown in a city setting.

In some cities in Spain, the term barrio chino ('Chinese quarter') denotes an area, neighborhood or district where prostitution or other businesses are concentrated; i.e. a red-light district. Some examples of this are the Chinatown of Salamanca and Barri Xinès, the Chinatown of Barcelona a part of El Raval, although in Barcelona there was a small Chinese community in the 1930s.

History

Trading centers populated predominantly by Chinese men and their native spouses have long existed throughout Southeast Asia. Emigration to other parts of the world from China accelerated in the 1860s with the signing of the Treaty of Peking (1860), which opened China's borders to free movement. Early emigrants came primarily from the coastal provinces of Guangdong (Canton, Kwangtung) and Fujian (Fukien, Hokkien) in southeastern China – where the people generally speak Toishanese, Cantonese, Hakka, Teochew (Chiuchow) and Hokkien.  In the late 19th century and early 20th century, a significant amount of Chinese emigration to North America originated from four counties called Sze Yup, located west of the Pearl River Delta in Guangdong province, making Toishanese a dominant variety of the Chinese language spoken in Chinatowns in Canada and the United States.

As conditions in China have improved in recent decades, many Chinatowns have lost their initial mission, which was to provide a transitional place into a new culture. As net migration has slowed into them, the smaller Chinatowns have slowly decayed, often to the point of becoming purely historical and no longer serving as ethnic enclaves.

In Asia

Along the coastal areas of Southeast Asia, several Chinese settlements existed as early as the 16th century according to Zheng He and Tomé Pires' travel accounts. Melaka during the Portuguese colonial period, for instance, had a large Chinese population in Campo China. They settled down at port towns under the authority's approval for trading. After the European colonial powers seized and ruled the port towns in the 16th century, Chinese supported European traders and colonists, and created autonomous settlements.

Several Asian Chinatowns, although not yet called by that name, have a long history. Those in Nagasaki, Kobe, and Yokohama, Japan, Binondo in Manila, Hoi An and Bao Vinh in central Vietnam all existed in 1600. Glodok, the Chinese quarter of Jakarta, Indonesia, dates to 1740.

Chinese presence in India dates back to the 5th century CE, with the first recorded Chinese settler in Calcutta named Young Atchew around 1780. Chinatowns first appeared in the Indian cities of Kolkata, Mumbai, and Chennai. There is also a huge presence of Chinese in Pakistan numbering around 60,000 but they are mostly recent immigrated workers, Architects and professionals who came to Pakistan after China Pakistan Economic Corridor was launched. Large investments in Pakistan by the Chinese government have led to a mass immigration of Chinese citizens to Pakistan because of shortage of a skilled workers. But there is also a large number of Chinese who came to Pakistan in 1949 due to fears of Communist persecution. They are mostly situated in Karachi and represent the oldest Chinese in Pakistan after independence.

The Chinatown centered on Yaowarat Road in Bangkok, Thailand, was founded at the same time as the city itself, in 1782.

Outside of Asia
 Many Chinese immigrants arrived in Liverpool in the late 1850s in the employ of the Blue Funnel Shipping Line, a cargo transport company established by Alfred Holt. The commercial shipping line created strong trade links between the cities of Shanghai, Hong Kong, and Liverpool, mainly in the importation of silk, cotton, and tea. They settled near the docks in south Liverpool, this area was heavily bombed during World War II, causing the Chinese community moving to the current  locationLiverpool Chinatown on Nelson Street.

The Chinatown in San Francisco is one of the largest in North America and the oldest north of Mexico. It served as a port of entry for early Chinese immigrants from the 1850s to the 1900s. The area was the one geographical region deeded by the city government and private property owners which allowed Chinese persons to inherit and inhabit dwellings within the city. Many Chinese found jobs working for large companies seeking a source of labor, most famously as part of the Central Pacific on the Transcontinental Railroad. Since it started in Omaha, that city had a notable Chinatown for almost a century. Other cities in North America where Chinatowns were founded in the mid-nineteenth century include almost every major settlement along the West Coast from San Diego to Victoria. Other early immigrants worked as mine workers or independent prospectors hoping to strike it rich during the 1849 Gold Rush.

Economic opportunity drove the building of further Chinatowns in the United States. The initial Chinatowns were built in the Western United States in states such as California, Oregon, Washington, Idaho, Utah, Colorado and Arizona. As the transcontinental railroad was built, more Chinatowns started to appear in railroad towns such as St. Louis, Chicago, Cincinnati, Pittsburgh and Butte, Montana. Chinatowns then subsequently emerged in many East Coast cities, including New York City, Boston, Philadelphia, Providence and Baltimore. With the passage of the Emancipation Proclamation, many southern states such as Arkansas, Louisiana and Georgia began to hire Chinese for work in place of slave labor.

The history of Chinatowns was not always peaceful, especially when labor disputes arose. Racial tensions flared when lower-paid Chinese workers replaced white miners in many mountain-area Chinatowns, such as in Wyoming with the Rock Springs Massacre. Many of these frontier Chinatowns became extinct as American racism surged and the Chinese Exclusion Act was passed.

In Australia, the Victorian gold rush, which began in 1851, attracted Chinese prospectors from the Guangdong area. A community began to form in the eastern end of Little Bourke Street, Melbourne by the mid-1850s; the area is still the center of the Melbourne Chinatown, making it the oldest continuously occupied Chinatown in a western city (since the San Francisco one was destroyed and rebuilt). Gradually expanding, it reached a peak in the early 20th century, with Chinese business, mainly furniture workshops, occupying a block wide swath of the city, overlapping into the adjacent 'Little Lon' red light district. With restricted immigration it shrunk again, becoming a strip of Chinese restaurants by the late 1970s, when it was celebrated with decorative arches. However, with a recent huge influx of students from mainland China, it is now the center of a much larger area of noodle shops, travel agents, restaurants, and groceries. The Australian gold rushes also saw the development of a Chinatown in Sydney, at first around The Rocks, near the docks, but it has moved twice, first in the 1890s to the east side of the Haymarket area, near the new markets, then in the 1920s concentrating on the west side. Nowadays, Sydney's Chinatown is centered on Dixon Street.

Other Chinatowns in European capitals, including Paris and London, were established at the turn of the 20th century. The first Chinatown in London was located in the Limehouse area of the East End of London at the start of the 20th century. The Chinese population engaged in business which catered to the Chinese sailors who frequented the Docklands. The area acquired a bad reputation from exaggerated reports of opium dens and slum housing.

France received a large settlement of Chinese immigrant laborers, mostly from the city of Wenzhou, in the Zhejiang province of China. Significant Chinatowns sprung up in Belleville and the 13th arrondissement of Paris.

1970s to the present
By the late 1970s, refugees and exiles from the Vietnam War played a significant part in the redevelopment of Chinatowns in developed Western countries. As a result, many existing Chinatowns have become pan-Asian business districts and residential neighborhoods. By contrast, most Chinatowns in the past had been largely inhabited by Chinese from southeastern China.

In 2001, the events of September 11 resulted in a mass migration of about 14,000 Chinese workers from Manhattan's Chinatown to Montville, Connecticut, due to the fall of the garment industry. Chinese workers transitioned to casino jobs fueled by the development of the Mohegan Sun casino.

In 2012, Tijuana's Chinatown formed as a result of availability of direct flights to China.  The La Mesa District of Tijuana was formerly a small enclave, but has tripled in size as a result of direct flights to Shanghai. It has an ethnic Chinese population rise from 5,000 in 2009 to roughly 15,000 in 2012, overtaking Mexicali's Chinatown as the largest Chinese enclave in Mexico.

The New York metropolitan area, consisting of New York City, Long Island, and nearby areas within the states of New York, New Jersey, Connecticut, and Pennsylvania, is home to the largest Chinese-American population of any metropolitan area within the United States and the largest Chinese population outside of China, enumerating an estimated 893,697 in 2017, and including at least 12 Chinatowns, including nine in New York City proper alone. Steady immigration from Mainland China, both legal and illegal, has fueled Chinese-American population growth in the New York metropolitan area. New York's status as an alpha global city, its extensive mass transit system, and the New York metropolitan area's enormous economic marketplace are among the many reasons it remains a major international immigration hub. The Manhattan Chinatown contains the largest concentration of ethnic Chinese in the Western hemisphere, and the Flushing Chinatown in Queens has become the world's largest Chinatown, though it has also emerged as the epicenter of organized prostitution in the United States.

The COVID-19 pandemic has adversely affected tourism and business in Chinatown, San Francisco and Chinatown, Chicago, Illinois as well as others worldwide.

Chinese settlements

History
People of Fujian province used to move over the South China Sea from the 14th century to look for more stable jobs, in most cases of trading and fishery, and settled down near the port/jetty under approval of the local authority such as Magong (Penghu), Hoian (Vietnam), Songkla (Thailand), Malacca (Malaysia), Banten, Semarang, Tuban (Indonesia), Manila (the Philippines), etc. A large number of this kind of settlements was developed along the coastal areal of the South China Sea, and was called "Campon China" by Portuguese account and "China Town" by English account.

Settlement pattern
The settlement was developed along a jetty and protected by Mazu temple, which was dedicated for the Goddess of Sea for safe sailing. Market place was open in front of Mazu temple, and shophouses were built along the street leading from west side of the Mazu temple. At the end of the street, Tudigong (Land God) temple was placed. As the settlement prospered as commercial town, Kuan Ti temple would be added for commercial success, especially by people from Hong Kong and Guangdong province. This core pattern was maintained even the settlement got expanded as a city, and forms historical urban center of the Southeast Asia.

Characteristics
The features described below are characteristic of many modern Chinatowns.

Demographics
The early Chinatowns such as those in San Francisco and Los Angeles in the United States were naturally destinations for people of Chinese descent as migration were the result of opportunities such as the California Gold Rush and the Transcontinental Railroad drawing the population in, creating natural Chinese enclaves that were almost always 100% exclusively Han Chinese, which included both people born in China and in the enclave, in this case American-born Chinese.  In some free countries such as the United States and Canada, housing laws that prevent discrimination also allows neighborhoods that may have been characterized as "All Chinese" to also allow non-Chinese to reside in these communities.  For example, the Chinatown in Philadelphia has a sizeable non-Chinese population residing within the community.  

A recent study also suggests that the demographic change is also driven by gentrification of what were previously Chinatown neighborhoods.  The influx of luxury housing is speeding up the gentrification of such neighborhoods. The trend for emergence of these types of natural enclaves is on the decline (with the exceptions being the continued growth and emergence of newer Chinatowns in Queens and Brooklyn in New York City), only to be replaced by newer "Disneyland-like" attractions, such as a new Chinatown that will be built in the Catskills region of New York.  This includes the endangerment of existing historical Chinatowns that will eventually stop serving the needs of Chinese immigrants.  

Newer developments like those in Norwich, Connecticut, and the San Gabriel Valley, which are not necessarily considered "Chinatowns" in the sense that they do not necessarily contain the Chinese architectures or Chinese language signs as signatures of an officially sanctioned area that was designated either in law or signage stating so, differentiate areas that are called "Chinatowns" versus locations that have "significant" populations of people of Chinese descent.  For example, San Jose, California in the United States has 63,434 people (2010 U.S. Census) of Chinese descent, and yet "does not have a Chinatown".  Some "official" Chinatowns have Chinese populations much lower than that.

Town-Scape

Many tourist-destination metropolitan Chinatowns can be distinguished by large red arch entrance structures known in Mandarin Chinese as Paifang (sometimes accompanied by imperial guardian lion statues on either side of the structure, to greet visitors).  Other Chinese architectural styles such as the Chinese Garden of Friendship in Sydney Chinatown and the Chinese stone lions at the gate to the Victoria, British Columbia Chinatown are present in some Chinatowns. Mahale Chiniha, the Chinatown in Iran, contains many buildings that were constructed in the Chinese architectural style.

Paifangs usually have special inscriptions in Chinese. Historically, these gateways were donated to a particular city as a gift from the Republic of China and People's Republic of China, or local governments (such as Chinatown, San Francisco) and business organizations. The long-neglected Chinatown in Havana, Cuba, received materials for its paifang from the People's Republic of China as part of the Chinatown's gradual renaissance. Construction of these red arches is often financed by local financial contributions from the Chinatown community. Some of these structures span an entire intersection, and some are smaller in height and width. Some paifang can be made of wood, masonry or steel and may incorporate an elaborate or simple design.

Benevolent and business associations

A major component of many Chinatowns is the family benevolent association, which provides some degree of aid to immigrants. These associations generally provide social support, religious services, death benefits (members' names in Chinese are generally enshrined on tablets and posted on walls), meals, and recreational activities for ethnic Chinese, especially for older Chinese migrants. Membership in these associations can be based on members sharing a common Chinese surname or belonging to a common clan, spoken Chinese dialect, specific village, region or country of origin, and so on. Many have their own facilities.

Some examples include San Francisco's prominent Chinese Consolidated Benevolent Association (中華總會館 Zhōnghuá Zǒng Huìguǎn), aka Chinese Six Companies and Los Angeles' Southern California Teochew Association. The Chinese Consolidated Benevolent Association is among the largest umbrella groups of benevolent associations in the North America, which branches in several Chinatowns. Politically, the CCBA has traditionally been aligned with the Kuomintang and the Republic of China.

The London Chinatown Chinese Association is active in Chinatown, London. Chinatown, Paris has an institution in the Association des Résidents en France d'origine indochinoise and it servicing overseas Chinese immigrants in Paris who were born in the former French Indochina.

Traditionally, Chinatown-based associations have also been aligned with ethnic Chinese business interests, such as restaurant, grocery, and laundry (antiquated) associations in Chinatowns in North America. In Chicago's Chinatown, the On Leong Merchants Association was active.

Names

English

Although the term "Chinatown" was first used in Asia, it is not derived from a Chinese language.  Its earliest appearance seems to have been in connection with the Chinese quarter of Singapore, which by 1844 was already being called "China Town" or "Chinatown" by the British colonial government. This may have been a word-for-word translation into English of the Malay name for that quarter, which in those days was probably "Kampong China" or possibly "Kota China" or "Kampong Tionghua/Chunghwa/Zhonghua".

The first appearance of a Chinatown outside Singapore may have been in 1852, in a book by the Rev. Hatfield, who applied the term to the Chinese part of the main settlement on the remote South Atlantic island of St. Helena. The island was a regular way-station on the voyage to Europe and North America from Indian Ocean ports, including Singapore.

One of the earliest American usages dates to 1855, when San Francisco newspaper The Daily Alta California described a "pitched battle on the streets of [SF's] Chinatown".  Other Alta articles from the late 1850s make it clear that areas called "Chinatown" existed at that time in several other California cities, including Oroville and San Andres. By 1869, "Chinatown had acquired its full modern meaning all over the U.S. and Canada.  For instance, an Ohio newspaper wrote: "From San Diego to Sitka..., every town and hamlet has its 'Chinatown'."

In British publications before the 1890s, "Chinatown" appeared mainly in connection with California.  At first, Australian and New Zealand journalists also regarded Chinatowns as Californian phenomena.  However, they began using the term to denote local Chinese communities as early as 1861 in Australia and 1873 in New Zealand. In most other countries, the custom of calling local Chinese communities "Chinatowns" is not older than the twentieth century.

Several alternate English names for Chinatown include China Town (generally used in British and Australian English), The Chinese District, Chinese Quarter and China Alley (an antiquated term used primarily in several rural towns in the western United States for a Chinese community; some of these are now historical sites). In the case of Lillooet, British Columbia, Canada, China Alley was a parallel commercial street adjacent to the town's Main Street, enjoying a view over the river valley adjacent and also over the main residential part of Chinatown, which was largely of adobe construction. All traces of Chinatown and China Alley there have disappeared, despite a once large and prosperous community.

In Chinese

In Chinese, Chinatown is usually called , in Cantonese Tong jan gai, in Mandarin Tángrénjiē, in Hakka Tong ngin gai, and in Toisan Hong ngin gai, literally meaning "Tang people's street(s)". The Tang Dynasty was a zenith of the Chinese civilization, after which some Chinese call themselves. Some Chinatowns are indeed just one single street, such as the relatively short Fisgard Street in Victoria, British Columbia, Canada.

Bù, pronounced sometimes in Mandarin as fù, usually means seaport; but in this sense, it means city or town. Tong jan fau (  "Tang people's town") is also used in Cantonese nowadays. The literal word-for-word translation of Chinatown—Zhōngguó Chéng is also used, but more frequently by visiting Chinese nationals rather than immigrants of Chinese descent who live in various Chinatowns.

Chinatowns in Southeast Asia have unique Chinese names used by the local Chinese, as there are large populations of people who are Overseas Chinese, living within the various major cities of Southeast Asia. As the population of Overseas Chinese, is widely dispersed in various enclaves, across each major Southeast Asian city, specific Chinese names are used instead.

For example, in Singapore, where 2.8 million ethnic Chinese constitute a majority 74% of the resident population, the Chinese name for Chinatown is Niúchēshǔi (Hokkien POJ: Gû-chia-chúi), which literally means "ox-cart water" from the Malay 'Kreta Ayer' in reference to the water carts that used to ply the area. The Chinatown in Kuala Lumpur, Malaysia, (where 2 million ethnic Chinese comprise 30% of the population of Greater Kuala Lumpur) while officially known as Petaling Street (Malay: Jalan Petaling), is referred to by Malaysian Chinese by its Cantonese name ci4 cong2 gaai1 (pinyin: Cíchǎng Jiē), literally "tapioca factory street", after a tapioca starch factory that once stood in the area. In Manila, Philippines, the area is called Mínlúnluò Qū , literally meaning the "Mín and Luò Rivers confluence district" but is actually a transliteration of the local term Binondo and an allusion to its proximity to the Pasig River.

Other languages
In Francophone regions (such as France and Quebec), Chinatown is often referred to as le quartier chinois (the Chinese Quarter; plural: les quartiers chinois).  The most prominent Francophone Chinatowns are located in Paris and Montreal.

The Spanish-language term is usually barrio chino (Chinese neighborhood; plural: barrios chinos), used in Spain and Latin America. (However, barrio chino or its Catalan cognate barri xinès do not always refer to a Chinese neighborhood: these are also common terms for a disreputable district with drugs and prostitution, and often no connection to the Chinese.).

The Vietnamese term for Chinatown is Khu người Hoa (Chinese district) or phố Tàu (Chinese street). Vietnamese language is prevalent in Chinatowns of Paris, Los Angeles, Boston, Philadelphia, Toronto, and Montreal as ethnic Chinese from Vietnam have set up shop in them.

In Japanese, the term "chūkagai" (中華街, literally "Chinese Street") is the translation used for Yokohama and Nagasaki Chinatown.

In Indonesia, chinatown is known as Pecinan, a shortened term of pe-cina-an, means everything related to the Chinese people. Most of these pecinans usually located in Java.

Some languages have adopted the English-language term, such as Dutch and German.

Locations

Africa

There are three noteworthy Chinatowns in Africa located in the coastal African nations of Madagascar, Mauritius and South Africa.  South Africa has the largest Chinatown and the largest Chinese population of any African country and remains a popular destination for Chinese immigrants coming to Africa.  Derrick Avenue in Cyrildene, Johannesburg, hosts South Africa's largest Chinatown.

Americas

In the Americas, which includes North America, Central America and South America, Chinatowns have been around since the 1800s.  The most prominent ones exist in the United States and Canada in New York, Boston, San Francisco, Toronto and Vancouver. The New York City metropolitan area is home to the largest ethnic Chinese population outside of Asia, comprising an estimated 893,697 uniracial individuals as of 2017, including at least 12 Chinatowns – six (or nine, including the emerging Chinatowns in Corona and Whitestone, Queens, and East Harlem, Manhattan) in New York City proper, and one each in Nassau County, Long Island; Edison, New Jersey; and Parsippany-Troy Hills, New Jersey, not to mention fledgling ethnic Chinese enclaves emerging throughout the New York City metropolitan area. San Francisco, a Pacific port city, has the oldest and longest continuous running Chinatown in the Western Hemisphere. In Canada, Vancouver's Chinatown is the country's largest.

The oldest Chinatown in the Americas is in Mexico City and dates back to at least the early 17th century. Since the 1970s, new arrivals have typically hailed from Hong Kong, Macau, and Taiwan. Latin American Chinatowns may include the descendants of original migrants – often of mixed Chinese and Latin parentage – and more recent immigrants from East Asia. Most Asian Latin Americans are of Cantonese and Hakka origin. Estimates widely vary on the number of Chinese descendants in Latin America. Notable Chinatowns also exist in Chinatown, Lima, Peru.

Asia

Chinatowns in Asia are widespread with a large concentration of overseas Chinese in East Asia and Southeast Asia and ethnic Chinese whose ancestors came from southern China – particularly the provinces of Guangdong, Fujian, and Hainan – and settled in countries such as Brunei, Cambodia, Indonesia, Laos, Malaysia, Myanmar, Singapore, the Philippines, Thailand, and Vietnam centuries ago—starting as early as the Tang Dynasty, but mostly notably in the 17th through the 19th centuries (during the reign of the Qing Dynasty), and well into the 20th century. Today the Chinese diaspora in Asia is largely concentrated in Southeast Asia however the legacy of the once widespread overseas Chinese communities in Asia is evident in the many Chinatowns that are found across East Asia, South Asia, and Southeast Asia.

Vietnam houses the largest Chinatown by size in Ho Chi Minh City (formerly Saigon).

Australia and Oceania

The Chinatown of Melbourne lies within the Melbourne central business district and centers on the eastern end of Little Bourke Street. It extends between the corners of Swanston and Exhibition Streets.  Melbourne's Chinatown originated during the Victorian gold rush in 1851, and is notable as the oldest Chinatown in Australia. It has also been claimed to be the longest continuously running Chinese community outside of Asia, but only because the 1906 San Francisco earthquake all but destroyed the Chinatown in San Francisco in California.

Sydney's main Chinatown centers on Sussex Street in the Sydney downtown. It stretches from Central Station in the east to Darling Harbour in the west, and is Australia's largest Chinatown.

The Chinatown of Adelaide was originally built in the 1960s and was renovated in the 1980s. It is located near Adelaide Central Market and the Adelaide Central bus station.

Chinatown Gold Coast is a precinct in the Central Business District of Southport, Queensland, that runs through Davenport Street and Young Street. The precinct extends between Nerang Street in the north and Garden Street/Scarborough Street east-west. Redevelopment of the precinct was established in 2013 and completed in 2015 in time for Chinese New Year celebrations.

There are additional Chinatowns in Brisbane, Perth, and Broome in Australia.

Europe

Several urban Chinatowns exist in major European capital cities. There is Chinatown, London, England as well as major Chinatowns in Birmingham, Liverpool, Newcastle, and Manchester. Berlin, Germany has one established Chinatown in the area around Kantstrasse of Charlottenburg in the West. Antwerp, Belgium has also seen an upstart Chinese community, that has been recognized by the local authorities since 2011. The city council of Cardiff has plans to recognize the Chinese Diaspora in the city.

The Chinatown in Paris, located in the 13th arrondissement, is the largest in Europe, where many Vietnamese – specifically ethnic Chinese refugees from Vietnam – have settled and in Belleville in the northeast of Paris as well as in Lyon. In Italy, there is a Chinatown in Milan between Via Luigi Canonica and Via Paolo Sarpi and others in Rome and Prato. In the Netherlands, Chinatowns exist in Amsterdam, Rotterdam and the Hague.

In the United Kingdom, several exist in Birmingham, Liverpool, London, Manchester and Newcastle Upon Tyne. The Chinatown in Liverpool is the oldest Chinese community in Europe.  The Chinatown in London was established in the Limehouse district in the late 19th century. The Chinatown in Manchester is located in central Manchester.

In popular culture
Chinatowns have been portrayed in various films including The Joy Luck Club, Big Trouble in Little China, Year of the Dragon, Flower Drum Song, The Lady from Shanghai and Chinatown. Within the context of the last film "Chinatown" is used primarily as an extended metaphor for any situation in which an outside entity seeks to intervene without having the local knowledge required to understand the consequences of that intervention. The neighborhood or district is often associated with being outside the normal rule of law or isolated from the social norms of the larger society.

Chinatowns have also been mentioned in the song "Kung Fu Fighting" by Carl Douglas whose song lyrics says "...There was funky China men from funky Chinatown..."

The martial arts actor Bruce Lee is well known as a person who was born in the Chinatown of San Francisco. Other notable Chinese Americans such as politician Gary Locke and NBA player Jeremy Lin grew up in suburbs with lesser connections to traditional Chinatowns.  Neighborhood activists and politicians have increased in prominence in some cities, and some are starting to attract support from non-Chinese voters.

Some notable temples in Chinatowns worldwide
 San Francisco's Chinatown – Tin How Temple, Ma-Tsu Temple
 Los Angeles Chinatown – Thien Hau Temple
 Yokohama Chinatown – Yokohama Ma Zhu Miao
 Bangkok Chinatown – Leng Buai Ia Shrine, Wat Bamphen Chin Phrot & Wat Mangkon Kamalawat )
 Yangon Chinatown – Kheng Hock Keong & Guanyin Gumiao Temple
 Jakarta Chinatown – Kim Tek Ie Temple
 Kuala Lumpur Chinatown – Sin Sze Si Ya Temple
 Malacca Chinatown – Cheng Hoon Teng Temple
 Terengganu Chinatown – Ho Ann Kiong Temple & Tian Hou Gong Temple
 Davao Chinatown – Lon Wa Buddhist Temple
 Chinatown and Malaytown in Kedah
 Gaya Street, Kota Kinabalu
 Chinatown, Kuching

See also

 Chinese folk religion
 Chinese ancestral worship
 Kongsi and Chinese lineage associations
 Chinese Consolidated Benevolent Association 
 Kapitan Cina and Kong Koan
 Chinese Overseas
 Chinatowns in Asia
 Chinatowns in Europe
 Chinatowns in Oceania
 Chinatowns in the United States
 Chinatown bus lines
 List of U.S. cities with significant Chinese-American populations
 Anti-Chinese legislation in the United States
 Chinese Exclusion Act in United States
 Chinese Immigration Act, 1923 in Canada
 Chinese Immigration Act of 1885 in Canada
 Chinese head tax in Canada
 New Zealand head tax
 Ethnic enclave
 White Australia Policy
 Legislation on Chinese Indonesians
 1740 Batavia massacre and 1918 Kudus riot
 Internment of Chinese-Indians (1962)

References

Citations

Sources 

 Chew, James R. "Boyhood Days in Winnemucca, 1901–1910." Nevada Historical Society Quarterly 1998 41(3): 206–209. ISSN 0047-9462 Oral history (1981) describes the Chinatown of Winnemucca, Nevada, during 1901–10. Though many Chinese left Winnemucca after the Central Pacific Railroad was completed in 1869, around four hundred Chinese had formed a community in the town by the 1890s. Among the prominent buildings was the Joss House, a place of worship and celebration that was visited by Chinese revolutionist Sun Yat-Sen in 1911. Beyond describing the physical layout of the Chinatown, the author recalls some of the commercial and gambling activities in the community.
 Ki Longfellow, China Blues, Eio Books 2012, San Francisco's Chinatown during the 1906 earthquake and in the early 1920s. (Eio Books)
 "Chinatown: Conflicting Images, Contested Terrain", K. Scott Wong, Melus (Vol. 20, Issue 1), 1995. Scholarly work discussing the negative perceptions and imagery of old Chinatowns.
 Pan, Lynn. Sons of the Yellow Emperor: A History of the Chinese Diaspora (1994). Book with detailed histories of Chinese diaspora communities (Chinatowns) from San Francisco, Honolulu, Bangkok, Manila, Johannesburg, Sydney, London, Lima, etc.
 Williams, Daniel. "Chinatown Is a Hard Sell in Italy", The Washington Post Foreign Service, March 1, 2004; Page A11.

Further reading
 

 
Chinese culture
Chinese diaspora